The 2nd Cornwall MRC Formula 1 Race was a motor race, run to Formula One rules, held on 2 August 1954 at the Davidstow Circuit, Cornwall. The race was to be run over 30 laps of the little circuit, but this was reduced to 20 laps due to the bad weather. The race was won by British driver John Coombs in a Lotus Mk VIII.

This was the second of three Formula One races held in Cornwall during 1954 and 1955, and the first Formula One race to be won by a Lotus.

Rodney Nuckey led the race until lap 17, when he suffered oil pressure problems, leaving Coombs and Tom Kyffin to battle for the lead until the end.

Results

Brandon's Cooper-Aston Martin blew its engine in practice, and a Bristol engine was installed in its place. This car was the Cooper-Bristol that Nuckey used during the race.

References

Cornwall MRC Formula 1 Race, II
Cornwall MRC Formula 1 Race
Corn
1950s in Cornwall